Thalatha Atukorale (born 30 May 1963) is a Sri Lankan politician and a member of the Parliament of Sri Lanka. Atukorale was appointed as the cabinet minister of Foreign Employment Promotion and Welfare by President Maithripala Sirisena on 12 January 2015. She was given the additional duties of Minister of Justice on 25 August 2017. becoming the first woman to hold that position in Sri Lanka. She is the sister of Gamini Atukorale, former Minister and assistant leader of the United National Party.

Atukorale came into active politics in 2004, after the death of her brother Gamini, a former cabinet minister and assistant leader of the United National Party. She won a seat in the parliament at the 2004, 2010 and the 2015 elections from Rathnapura district.

See also 
List of political families in Sri Lanka
Minister of Justice (Sri Lanka)

References
 

Specific

1963 births
Living people
Sri Lankan Buddhists
People from Ratnapura
Alumni of Musaeus College
Alumni of Bishop's College, Colombo
Sinhalese lawyers
Members of the 13th Parliament of Sri Lanka
Members of the 14th Parliament of Sri Lanka
Members of the 15th Parliament of Sri Lanka
Members of the 16th Parliament of Sri Lanka
Samagi Jana Balawegaya politicians
United National Party politicians
Women's ministers of Sri Lanka
21st-century Sri Lankan women politicians
Female justice ministers
Justice ministers of Sri Lanka